Eero Kivelä (born 1 May 1930) is a Finnish former sprinter. He competed in the men's 200 metres at the 1956 Summer Olympics.

References

External links
 

1930 births
Possibly living people
Athletes (track and field) at the 1956 Summer Olympics
Finnish male sprinters
Olympic athletes of Finland